The 1953 Campeonato Nacional de Fútbol Profesional was first tier's 21st season which Colo-Colo reached its sixth professional title.

Scores

Standings

Topscorer

References

External links
ANFP 
RSSSF Chile 1953

Primera División de Chile seasons
Primera
Chile